Samson Colebrooke (born 10 May 1997) is an Olympic sprinter from the Exuma Island in The Bahamas. He is the fastest-born Bahamian over 100m as Derrick Atkins, the national record holder, was born in Jamaica.

Personal and early life
Originally from Exuma, Bahamas, Colebrooke moved to America to study law at Purdue University. In 2019, Colebrooke won silver at the NACAC u23 championship in Mexico. Due to the emergence of the COVID-19 pandemic, Colebrooke found himself unable to return home before the Bahamas government closed its borders. He had to remain in America for an extended period.

Senior career
At the 2020 Summer Games, he was drawn in heat two of the 100 metres race, alongside Trayvon Bromell amongst others. Colebrooke finished 7th in the heat in a time of 10.33 seconds.  At the 2022 World Athletics Championships, Colebrooke ran in the 100 metres dash finishing fifth in his heat in a time of 10.23.

References

External links
 

1999 births
Living people
Bahamian male sprinters
Olympic athletes of the Bahamas
Athletes (track and field) at the 2020 Summer Olympics
People from Exuma
Barton Cougars men's track and field athletes
Purdue Boilermakers men's track and field athletes
Purdue University alumni